Jake Arnold Fraley (born May 25, 1995) is an American professional baseball outfielder for the Cincinnati Reds of Major League Baseball (MLB). He previously played for the Seattle Mariners.

Amateur career
Fraley attended Caravel Academy in Bear, Delaware, where he played for their baseball team. He batted .536 as a junior and .492 as a senior, and in his senior year was named to Louisville Slugger's All-American first team and the All-State first team.

Fraley enrolled at Louisiana State University (LSU) to play college baseball for the LSU Tigers. He batted .372 as a freshman in 2014, and was named a Freshman All-American by the National Collegiate Baseball Writers Association. He played collegiate summer baseball for the Chatham Anglers of the Cape Cod Baseball League after his freshman and sophomore years.

Professional career

Tampa Bay Rays
The Tampa Bay Rays selected Fraley with the 77th overall selection of the 2016 MLB draft. He spent the 2016 season with the Hudson Valley Renegades where he batted .238 with one home run, 18 RBIs and 33 stolen bases in 55 games. In 2017, he played for the Charlotte Stone Crabs, posting a .170 batting average with one home run and 12 RBIs in only 26 games due to injury, and in 2018, he returned to the Stone Crabs, batting .347/.415/.547 with four home runs, 41 RBIs, and 11 stolen bases in 66 games.

In that off-season, Fraley played in the 2017–18 Australian Baseball League season for the Perth Heat batting .361/.449/.680 in 40 games, setting the runs (50) and stolen base (39) records.

Seattle Mariners
On November 8, 2018, Fraley was traded to the Seattle Mariners along with Mallex Smith for Mike Zunino, Guillermo Heredia, and Michael Plassmeyer. He began the 2019 season with the Arkansas Travelers of the Class AA Texas League. The Mariners promoted Fraley to the Tacoma Rainiers of the Class AAA Pacific Coast League on June 20.

On August 20, 2019, the Mariners selected Fraley's contract and promoted him to the major leagues. He made his major league debut on August 21 versus the Tampa Bay Rays. He batted .150 in 12 games. For the abbreviated 2020 season, Fraley appeared in seven games with the Mariners, getting four hits in 23 at-bats.

On June 6, 2021, Fraley hit his first career home run, a three-run shot off Griffin Canning of the Los Angeles Angels. In a June 9 matchup against the Detroit Tigers, Fraley made a leaping catch to rob rookie Isaac Paredes of a walk-off home run, instead sending the game to extras when a quick relay to first base allowed for an inning-ending double play. He notched a go-ahead single in the 11th inning to carry his team to a 9–6 victory. Fraley finished the 2021 season batting .210 with 9 home runs, 36 RBIs and 10 stolen bases in 78 games.

Cincinnati Reds
On March 14, 2022, the Mariners traded Fraley, Justin Dunn, Brandon Williamson, and a player to be named later (Connor Phillips) to the Cincinnati Reds in exchange for Eugenio Suárez and Jesse Winker.

On May 1, Fraley was placed on the injured list with right knee inflammation, and was shifted to the 60-day IL on June 13.

Personal life
Fraley was born in Frederick, Maryland on May 25, 1995. He is a Christian. He has an older sister, Lauren, and two younger brothers, Andrew, and Brandon and two younger sisters, Hallie and Megan Myers. His younger brother, Brandon, is also a baseball player who attended Caravel Academy. Fraley married Angelica Caceres on October 21, 2016, in Miami, Florida. They have two children.

References

External links

1995 births
Living people
People from Middletown, Delaware
Baseball players from Delaware
Major League Baseball outfielders
Seattle Mariners players
Cincinnati Reds players
LSU Tigers baseball players
Chatham Anglers players
Gulf Coast Rays players
Hudson Valley Renegades players
Charlotte Stone Crabs players
Arkansas Travelers players
Tacoma Rainiers players
Perth Heat players
American expatriate baseball players in Australia